Sekai Nippo (世界日報) is a Japanese Language newspaper, owned by News World Communications, which was established by the Unification Church.

References
1.https://www.mondotimes.com/1/world/jp/200/4646/11712

External links
 Official website

Newspapers published in Tokyo
Japanese-language newspapers
Unification Church affiliated organizations
Publications with year of establishment missing